Andrew Tretton (born 9 October 1976) is an English former footballer who played as a defender in the Football League for Shrewsbury Town. He retired in 2007 due to a persistent knee injury.

External links

1976 births
Living people
Footballers from Derby
English footballers
England semi-pro international footballers
Association football defenders
Derby County F.C. players
Gresley F.C. players
Chesterfield F.C. players
Shrewsbury Town F.C. players
Hereford United F.C. players
Accrington Stanley F.C. players
English Football League players
National League (English football) players